That's Dancing! is a 1985 American compilation film produced by Metro-Goldwyn-Mayer that looked back at the history of dancing in film. Unlike the That's Entertainment! series, this film not only focuses specifically on MGM films, but also included films from other studios.

A highlight of the film was the first theatrical release of a complete dance routine by Ray Bolger for his "If I Only Had a Brain" number that had been shortened in The Wizard of Oz.

The hosts for this film are Gene Kelly (who also executive produced), Ray Bolger (his last film appearance before his death in 1987), Liza Minnelli, Sammy Davis Jr., and Mikhail Baryshnikov. Pop singer Kim Carnes was commissioned to sing an original song, "Invitation to Dance", that plays over the closing credits.

This film is sometimes considered part of the That's Entertainment! series, especially since its starting credits contain a card with the That's Entertainment! III title (not to be confused with the 1994 film), but even though it shared studio and producers, it is considered a separate production. Jack Haley Jr., who wrote, produced  and directed the first That's Entertainment! film, also wrote and directed this one, co-producing with longtime friend David Niven Jr. Haley's father, Jack Haley, had co-starred with Bolger in The Wizard of Oz.

That's Dancing! was not included when the three That's Entertainment! films were released on DVD in 2004; it was instead released on its own in 2007. The DVD includes several behind-the-scenes promotional featurettes from 1985 on the making of the film, as well as its accompanying music video featuring Kim Carnes singing "Invitation to Dance" although the DVD omits both the video and song itself.

Dedication 
This film is dedicated to all dancers, especially those who devoted their lives to the development of their art long before there was a motion picture camera.

Appearances 

 Tommy Abbott
 June Allyson
 Ann-Margret
 Fred Astaire
 Lucille Ball
 Mikhail Baryshnikov
 Jennifer Beals
 David Bean
 Busby Berkeley
 Eric Blore
 Monte Blue
 Ray Bolger
 John Brascia
 Lucille Bremer
 James Cagney
 Irene Cara
 Leslie Caron
 Gower Champion
 Marge Champion
 Cyd Charisse
 Joan Crawford
 Dan Dailey
 Jacques d'Amboise
 Sammy Davis Jr.
 Doris Day
 Gloria DeHaven
 Isadora Duncan
 Buddy Ebsen
 Taina Elg
 Eliot Feld
 Margot Fonteyn
 Loie Fuller
 Clark Gable
 Judy Garland
 Virginia Gibson
 Cary Grant
 Jack Haley
 Margaret Hamilton
 Carol Haney
 June Haver
 Robert Helpmann
 Judy Holliday
 José Iturbi
 Michael Jackson
 Marine Jahan
 Van Johnson
 Ruby Keeler
 Gene Kelly
 Paula Kelly
 Michael Kidd
 Charles Laskey
 Ruta Lee
 Vivien Leigh
 Bambi Linn
 Peter Lorre
 Susan Luckey
 Shirley MacLaine
 Dean Martin
 Léonide Massine
 Matt Mattox
 Joan McCracken
 Ray McDonald
 Ann Miller
 Liza Minnelli
 James Mitchell
 Ricardo Montalbán
 Annabelle Moore
 Tony Mordente
 George Murphy
 Gene Nelson
 Julie Newmar
 The Nicholas Brothers
 Rudolf Nureyev
 Donald O'Connor
 Anna Pavlova
 Marc Platt
 Dick Powell
 Eleanor Powell
 Jane Powell
 Tommy Rall
 Debbie Reynolds
 Jeff Richards
 Chita Rivera
 Bill "Bojangles" Robinson
 Ginger Rogers
 Mickey Rooney
 Wini Shaw
 Moira Shearer
 Frank Sinatra
 Red Skelton
 Tucker Smith
 James Stewart
 Lyle Talbot
 Russ Tamblyn
 Lilyan Tashman
 Robert Taylor
 Anthony 'Scooter' Teague
 Shirley Temple
 Tamara Toumanova
 John Travolta
 Lana Turner
 Bobby Van
 Vera-Ellen
 Ethel Waters
 Bobby Watson
 Esther Williams
 David Winters
 Vera Zorina
 Vincent Price
 Robert Banas
 Francesca Bellini
 Betty Carr
 Carole D'Andrea
 Leroy Daniels
 Norma Doggett
 Harvey Evans
 Nancy Kilgas
 Bert Michaels
 Susan Oakes
 Gina Trikonis
 Tarita

Films featured 

 The Dumb Girl of Portici (1916)
 So This Is Paris (1926)
 Flying High (1931)
 42nd Street (1933)
 Gold Diggers of 1933 (1933)
 Rufus Jones for President (1933)
 Dames (1934)
 The Gay Divorcee (1934)
 Gold Diggers of 1935 (1935)
 Broadway Melody of 1936 (1935)
 Roberta (1935)
 The Littlest Rebel (1935)
 Born to Dance (1936)
 Swing Time (1936)
 Honolulu (1939)
 The Wizard of Oz (1939)
 Gone with the Wind (1939)
 On Your Toes (1939)
 Down Argentine Way (1940)
 Babes on Broadway (1941)
 Yankee Doodle Dandy (1942)
 Bathing Beauty (1944)
 Kismet (1944)
 The All-Star Bond Rally (1945)
 The Harvey Girls (1946)
 Till the Clouds Roll By (1946)
 Ziegfeld Follies (1946)
 Good News (1947)
 The Red Shoes (1948)
 Neptune's Daughter (1949)
 Three Little Words (1950)
 Royal Wedding (1951)
 An American in Paris (1951)
 The Merry Widow (1952)
 Singin' in the Rain (1952)
 The Band Wagon (1953)
 Give a Girl a Break (1953)
 Kiss Me Kate (1953)
 Latin Lovers (1953)
 Seven Brides for Seven Brothers (1954)
 It's Always Fair Weather (1955)
 Jupiter's Darling (1955)
 Oklahoma! (1955)
 Carousel (1956)
 Invitation to the Dance (1956)
 Les Girls (1957)
 Silk Stockings (1957)
 Indiscreet (1958)
 tom thumb (1958)
 West Side Story (1961)
 Viva Las Vegas (1964)
 Sweet Charity (1969)
 The Boy Friend (1971)
 Cabaret (1972)
 Saturday Night Fever (1977)
 The Turning Point (1977)
 Fame (1980)
 Flashdance (1983)

Musical numbers

References

External links 
 
 
 
 

1985 films
1985 documentary films
1980s musical films
American documentary films
American musical films
Documentary films about films
Documentary films about dance
Metro-Goldwyn-Mayer films
Films directed by Jack Haley Jr.
Compilation films
1980s English-language films
1980s American films